George Parsons Dow  (August 7, 1840 – September 28, 1910) was a Union Army sergeant in the American Civil War, notable for receiving the Medal of Honor.

Birth
Dow was born on August 7, 1840, in Atkinson, New Hampshire, and was living in the city of Manchester when he joined the Union Army.

Military career
Dow's identity badge is in a well known private collection. He was a member of the 7th New Hampshire Volunteer Infantry, Company C, and received the Medal of Honor for "Gallantry in command of his company during a reconnaissance toward Richmond."

This mission occurred in October 1864. The 7th New Hampshire stood in a single line so that they could see the enemy and collect information regarding the strength of the Confederate defense. Dow later described his experience:

Death
He died at age 70 on September 28, 1910, and was buried in his hometown of Atkinson, New Hampshire.

See also

List of American Civil War Medal of Honor recipients: A–F

References

External links

1840 births
1910 deaths
People from Atkinson, New Hampshire
People of New Hampshire in the American Civil War
Union Army soldiers
United States Army Medal of Honor recipients
American Civil War recipients of the Medal of Honor